Paul Robert Verkuil (born December 4, 1939) is an American attorney, former dean of the Tulane University Law School, former president of the College of William and Mary, and former dean of Cardozo School of Law.  He has also served as the CEO of the American Automobile Association from 1992 to 1995. He is currently on the faculty of the Cardozo School of Law.

Verkuil received his A.B. at the College of William & Mary and his J.D. from the University of Virginia School of Law. He also earned an M.A. from the New School for Social Research, and an LL.M. and J.S.D. from New York University School of Law.

Verkuil served as president of the College of William & Mary from July 1, 1985 until his resignation, effective January 7, 1992.

Verkuil is coauthor of Administrative Law and Process (5th ed. 2009) and Regulation and Deregulation (2nd ed. 2004) and Outsourcing Sovereignty: How Privatization of Government Functions Threatens Democracy And What We Can Do About It (Cambridge University Press, 2007). He has been the editor of Virginia Law Review,  and the recipient of the NYU Founders Day Award for "Consistent evidence of outstanding scholarship."

From August 2008 to August 2009, Verkuil was acting dean of the University of Miami School of Law.

In 2009, Verkuil was nominated by President Barack Obama to be head of the Administrative Conference of the United States.  The Senate confirmed his nomination on March 3, 2010.  From 1994-97 he served as special master for the U.S. Supreme Court in the original jurisdiction case of New Jersey v. New York, 523 U.S. 767 (1998), and as a member of the White House Council on Small Business.

He is married to Judith Rodin, former president of the Rockefeller Foundation.

References

Living people
College of William & Mary alumni
Deans of Tulane University Law School
Deans of law schools in the United States
Presidents of the College of William & Mary
Tulane University faculty
Tulane University Law School faculty
University of Miami faculty
University of Virginia School of Law alumni
Cardozo School of Law faculty
New York University School of Law alumni
1939 births